Willis Stuart Olson (January 3, 1930 – April 9, 2021) was an American ski jumper. He competed in the normal hill at the 1952 and 1956 Winter Olympics and placed 22nd and 43rd, respectively. Olson won the NCAA ski jumping championships for the University of Denver in 1954-56 and another national title in 1958. In 1965 he moved to the veteran's category, winning the national veteran's championships in 1965, 1966 and 1968. Olson was inducted into the US Ski and Snowboard Hall of Fame in 1972.

References

External links

University of Denver athletic department timeline
Willis Stuart Olson at Olympics.com

1930 births
2021 deaths
American male ski jumpers
Olympic ski jumpers of the United States
Ski jumpers at the 1952 Winter Olympics
Ski jumpers at the 1956 Winter Olympics
Sportspeople from Eau Claire, Wisconsin
Sportspeople from Colorado
University of Denver alumni